CFAR-FM is a Canadian radio station that operates at 102.9 FM and 590 kHz AM, located in Flin flon, Manitoba. The FM station broadcasts with 600 watts; AM station broadcasts with a daytime transmitter power of 10,000 watts and at nighttime at 1,000 watts.

It is part of the Arctic Radio Network (Arctic Radio (1982) Limited), with sister stations in The Pas (CJAR) and Thompson (CHTM).

The station plays primarily adult contemporary music and Flin Flon Bombers ice hockey games.

History
 
The radio station originally began broadcasting at 1370 kHz on the AM dial in 1937.

In 1941, CFAR changed its frequency from to 1400 kHz.

In 1944, CFAR changed its frequency from to 1230 kHz.

In 1946, CFAR changed its frequency from to its last AM frequency 590 kHz.

Over the years, CFAR went through different ownerships and formats.

CFAR was an affiliate of the Canadian Broadcasting Corporation and its Trans-Canada Network and then CBC Radio until 1984.

On March 12, 2013, the CRTC approved CFAR's application to convert to the FM band at 102.9 MHz, with an effective radiated power of 600 watts, non-directional antenna with an effective HAAT of 27.7 metres. The applicant also requested permission to maintain its AM transmitter as a repeater at the current specifications in order to rebroadcast the new FM station's programming, which was granted.

Personalities
 Larry Thor, singer and writer (1937–40)

References

External links
CFAR homepage at Flin Flon Online
Arctic Radio Official Site
CFAR history

Far
Far
Radio stations established in 1937
Flin Flon
1937 establishments in Manitoba